Briseis (Brīsēís) ("daughter of Briseus"), also known as Hippodameia, is a significant character in the Iliad. Her role as a status symbol is at the heart of the dispute between Achilles and Agamemnon that initiates the plot of Homer's epic. She was married to Mynes, a son of the King of Lyrnessus, until Achilles sacked her city and enslaved her shortly before the events of the poem. Being forced to give Briseis to Agamemnon, Achilles refused to reenter the battle.

Description 
Briseis receives the same minimal physical description as most other minor characters in the Iliad. She is described with the standard metrical epithets that the poet uses to describe a great beauty, though her appearance is left entirely up to the audience's imagination. Her beauty is compared to that of the goddesses.

Briseis was imagined about two millennia later by the Byzantine poet John Tzetzes as: 

Meanwhile, in the account of Dares the Phrygian (between 1st century BC and 5th century AD), Briseis was illustrated as ". . .beautiful. She was small and blond, with soft yellow hair. Her eyebrows were joined above her lovely eyes. Her body was well-proportioned. She was charming, friendly, modest, ingenuous, and pious."

Mythology 
According to her mythology, Briseis was the daughter of Briseus, though her mother was unnamed. She had three full brothers who died in the sack of Lyrnessus.

When Achilles led the assault on Lyrnessus during the Trojan War, he captured Briseis and slew her parents and brothers. She was subsequently given to Achilles as a war prize to be his concubine. In the Mycenaean Greek society described in the Iliad, captive women like Briseis were slaves and could be traded amongst the warriors.

According to Book 1 of the Iliad, when Agamemnon was compelled by Apollo to give up his own slave, Chryseis, he demanded Briseis as compensation. This prompted a quarrel with Achilles that culminated with Briseis' delivery to Agamemnon and Achilles' protracted withdrawal from battle. His absence had disastrous consequences for the Greeks. Despite Agamemnon's grand offers of treasure and women, he did not return to the fray until the death of Patroclus.

Achilles was angry at Agamemnon, and seethed with rage in his tent that Agamemnon dared to insult him by stripping him of the prize that had been awarded to him. When Achilles returned to the fighting to avenge Patroclus' death and Agamemnon returned Briseis to him, Agamemnon swore to Achilles that he had never slept with Briseis.

When Odysseus, Ajax, and Phoenix visit Achilles to negotiate her return in book 9, Achilles refers to Briseis as his wife or his bride. He professes to have loved her as much as any man loves his wife, at one point using Menelaus and Helen to complain about the injustice of his "wife" being taken from him. This romanticized, domestic view of their relationship contrasts with book 19, in which Briseis herself speaks. As she laments Patroclus' death, she wonders what will happen to her without his intercession on her behalf, saying that Patroclus promised her he would get Achilles to make her his legal wife instead of his slave. 

In book 19 of the Iliad, Achilles makes a rousing speech to the Achaean soldiers. He publicly declares that he will ignore his anger with Agamemnon and return to battle. During his speech, Achilles says he wishes Briseis were dead, lamenting that she ever came between Agamemnon and himself. This contrasts his own statements in book 9.

She remained with Achilles until his death, which plunged her into great grief. She soon took it upon herself to prepare Achilles for the afterlife. According to Robert Bell, following his death, Briseis "was given to one of Achilles' comrades-at-arms just as his armor had been", after the fall of Troy.

In medieval romances, starting with the Roman de Troie, Briseis becomes Briseida and is the daughter of Calchas. She loves and is loved by Troilus and then Diomedes. She is later confused with Chryseis and it is under variations of that name that the character is developed further, becoming Shakespeare's Cressida.

Portrayals in art, film, and other media

 Iliad, a Greek epic poem attributed to Homer
 Heroides, a work by the Roman poet Ovid, made up of letters from mythological heroines to their heroes.
 Abduction of Briseis, a papyrus drawing, possibly of Ancient Egyptian origin, depicting Briseis being abducted by Agamemnon's heralds, Talthybius and Eurybates
 The Fury of Achilles, 1962 film directed by Marino Girolami, portrayed by Gloria Milland
 The Firebrand, a 1987 novel by Marion Zimmer Bradley
 Daughter of Troy, a 1998 novel by Dave Duncan
 Cassandra, a 1983 novel by Christa Wolf
 Troy, a 2004 film by Wolfgang Petersen, portrayed by Rose Byrne
 The Song of Achilles, a 2011 novel by Madeline Miller
 Hand of Fire, a 2014 novel by Judith Starkson
 Troy: Fall of a City, a 2018 miniseries by BBC, portrayed by Amy Louise Wilson
 The Silence of the Girls, a 2018 novel by Pat Barker, mostly narrated by Briseis
 A Thousand Ships, a 2019 novel by Natalie Haynes depicting the women of the Trojan War
 The Women of Troy, a 2021 novel by Pat Barker

Notes

References 

 Dares Phrygius, from The Trojan War. The Chronicles of Dictys of Crete and Dares the Phrygian translated by Richard McIlwaine Frazer, Jr. (1931-). Indiana University Press. 1966. Online version at theio.com
 Homer, The Iliad with an English Translation by A.T. Murray, Ph.D. in two volumes. Cambridge, MA., Harvard University Press; London, William Heinemann, Ltd. 1924. . Online version at the Perseus Digital Library.
 Homer, Homeri Opera in five volumes. Oxford, Oxford University Press. 1920. . Greek text available at the Perseus Digital Library.

External links

Queens in Greek mythology
Trojans
Women of the Trojan war
Fictional Greek and Roman slaves